The Bracelet is a 1930 novel by the British writer Robert Hichens. A society scandal breaks over a bracelet given by a man to a woman, leading to a court case.

References

Bibliography
 Vinson, James. Twentieth-Century Romance and Gothic Writers. Macmillan, 1982.

1930 British novels
Novels by Robert Hichens
Cassell (publisher) books